Ostrów Tumski (originally meaning "cathedral island") may refer to the following city quarters in Poland:
Ostrów Tumski, Poznań
Ostrów Tumski, Wrocław
Ostrów Tumski, Głogów